Wiesbaden-Erbenheim station is a railway station in the borough of Erbenheim in the Hessian state capital of Wiesbaden  on the Ländchesbahn from Wiesbaden to Niedernhausen. It is classified by Deutsche Bahn as a category 6 station. The station was opened in 1879.

Services
Erbenheim lies in the area served by the Rhein-Main-Verkehrsverbund (Rhine-Main Transport Association, RMV). It is used by Regionalbahn trains operated by DB Regio.

Trains
Regionalbahn services operate at hourly intervals on the Wiesbaden–Niedernhausen route. In the rush hour, the service extends to a half-hourly interval and a few trains run to Limburg.

Buses 
The station is also served by bus lines 5, 15, 28, 62 and 67, which stop at the Egerstraße bus stop 300 metres away.

References

Railway stations in Wiesbaden
Railway stations in Germany opened in 1879